Ubľa is a border village and municipality in Snina District in the Prešov Region of north-eastern Slovakia on the border with Ukraine.

History
In historical records the village was first mentioned in 1567.

Geography
The municipality lies at an altitude of 224 metres and covers an area of 29.144 km2. According to the 2013 census it had a population of 796 inhabitants.

References

External links
 
 
http://www.statistics.sk/mosmis/eng/run.html

Villages and municipalities in Snina District
Slovakia–Ukraine border crossings